Sarband or Sar-e Band may refer to:
 Sarband, an early music ensemble focusing on connections between European, Islamic and Jewish music

Places
in Iran
 Sarband, Ardabil, a village in Ardabil Province, Iran
 Shazand (formerly known as Sarband), a district or town in the Markazi Province, Iran
 Sarband, Bandar Abbas, a village in Hormozgan Province, Iran
 Sarband-e Parangi, a village in Hormozgan Province, Iran
 Sarband, Rudan, a village in Hormozgan Province, Iran
 Sar Band, Jiroft, a village in Kerman Province, Iran
 Sar Band-e Kasur, a village in Kerman Province, Iran
 Sarband, Khuzestan, a village in Khuzestan Province, Iran
 Sarband-e Deh Di, a village in Khuzestan Province, Iran
 Sarband-e Pain, a village in Khuzestan Province, Iran
 Sarband, Markazi, a village in Markazi Province, Iran
 Sarband-e Gaviad, a village in South Khorasan Province, Iran
 Sarband District (Iran), an administrative subdivision of Iran

in Tajikistan
 Sarband, Sughd, a village in Sughd Region
 Sarband, a former name of Levakant, a city in Khatlon Region
 Sarband District,  Khatlon Region, Tajikistan